Ahmed Kashi (born 18 November 1988) is a professional footballer who plays as a midfielder for club Annecy.

Born in France, he is a former Algeria international, and was a member of the squad at the 2015 Africa Cup of Nations.

Club career
Born in Aubervilliers, France, Kashi made his first team debut for Châteauroux on 15 April 2008, playing as a starter in the team's 2–0 league loss to Reims. In the summer of 2008, Kashi signed a one-year professional contract with Châteauroux.

On 18 July 2015, Kashi joined Charlton Athletic. He made his debut for Charlton against Queens Park Rangers on 8 August 2015, and scored his first goal for the club against Peterborough United in the League Cup on 25 August 2015. At the end of the 2017–18 season, Charlton entered into contract talks with Kashi. However, on 19 June 2018, caretaker manager for Charlton Athletic Lee Bowyer stated that Kashi would not be renewing his contract with the club.

On 16 July 2018, Kashi joined Troyes on a two-year deal. He was loaned out in January 2019 to Oxford United of EFL League One until the end of the season. He returned to his parent club at the end of the season, having made 12 appearances (11 of them in League One) without scoring. After his return, he was relegated to the Troyes' reserve team due to a conflict with the club.

On 3 February 2020, Kashi signed with Annecy.

International career
Born in France, Kashi is eligible to represent both France and Algeria. In an interview in 2009, he indicated that he would prefer to represent Algeria in international competition. In 2015, he was part of the Algeria national team at the 2015 Africa Cup of Nations, where he made his international debut in the final group stage match against Senegal.

Career statistics

Club

References

External links
 

Living people
1988 births
Sportspeople from Aubervilliers
French footballers
Association football midfielders
French sportspeople of Algerian descent
2015 Africa Cup of Nations players
Algeria international footballers
Algerian expatriate footballers
Algerian expatriate sportspeople in England
Algerian footballers
LB Châteauroux players
FC Metz players
Charlton Athletic F.C. players
ES Troyes AC players
Oxford United F.C. players
FC Annecy players
Ligue 1 players
Ligue 2 players
Championnat National players
English Football League players
Championnat National 2 players
Footballers from Seine-Saint-Denis